Swing Gently is a Canadian musical variety television program which aired on CBC Television in 1960.

Premise
Episodes featured the Billy Van Four with other regulars Allan Blye, Pam Hyatt Alan Millar and Ruth Walker. Visiting artists included musicians and dancers such as David Adams, Joey Hollingsworth, Nina Simone, Lois Smith and the Rhythm Pals.

Scheduling
This hour-long program was broadcast on Mondays at 9:30 p.m. from 18 July to 19 September 1960. In October 1960, Swing Gently became the regular season series Fancy Free.

References

External links
 

CBC Television original programming
1960 Canadian television series debuts
1960 Canadian television series endings
1960s Canadian variety television series